Giambattista Eustachio (1622–1687) was a Roman Catholic prelate who served as Bishop of Lucera (1663–1687).

Biography
Giambattista Eustachio was born in Troia, Italy in 1622.
On 12 February 1663, he was appointed Bishop of Lucera by Pope Alexander VII.
On 18 February 1663, he was consecrated bishop by Benedetto Odescalchi, Cardinal-Priest of Sant'Onofrio. 
He served as Bishop of Lucera until his death in September 1687.

While bishop, he was the principal co-consecrator of Ulysses Rossi, Auxiliary Bishop of Sabina and Titular Archbishop of Salamis (1681).

References

External links and additional sources
 (for Chronology of Bishops)  
 (for Chronology of Bishops)  

17th-century Italian Roman Catholic bishops
Bishops appointed by Pope Alexander VII
1622 births
1687 deaths